Daleq Tappeh (also Romanized as Dāleq Tappeh; also known as Deleq Tappeh) is a village in Jeyransu Rural District, in the Central District of Maneh and Samalqan County, North Khorasan Province, Iran. At the 2006 census, its population was 223, in 41 families.

References 

Populated places in Maneh and Samalqan County